Philonome is a genus of moths in the family Tineidae.

Species
Philonome albivittata Sohn & Davis, 2015
Philonome clemensella Chambers, 1874 
Philonome cuprescens Walsingham, 1914
Philonome curvilineata Sohn & Davis, 2015
Philonome euryarga Meyrick, 1915
Philonome kawakitai Sohn & Davis, 2015
Philonome lambdagrapha Sohn & Davis, 2015
Philonome nigrescens Sohn & Davis, 2015
Philonome penerivifera Sohn & Davis, 2015
Philonome rivifera Meyrick, 1915
Philonome spectata Meyrick, 1920
Philonome wielgusi Sohn & Davis, 2015

Former species
Philonome albella (Chambers, 1877) 
Philonome luteella (Chambers, 1875)

Taxonomy
The genus was previously placed in Lyonetiidae or Bucculatricidae.

External links
Butterflies and Moths of the World Generic Names and their Type-species

Tineidae
Tineidae genera